Uch Tappeh-ye Qaleh (also Romanized as Ūch Tappeh-ye Qal‘eh) is a village in Marhemetabad Rural District, in the Central District of Miandoab County, West Azerbaijan Province, Iran. At the 2006 census, its population was 1,298, in 345 families.

References 

Populated places in Miandoab County